Dasari Ramakotiah Institute of Science and Technology, popularly known to as "DRKIST", is an engineering college affiliated to the  Jawaharlal Nehru Technological University. It is approved by AICTE, New Delhi, and permitted by the government of Telangana.

See also 
Education in India
Literacy in India
List of institutions of higher education in Telangana

References

External links 
 Official website

Engineering colleges in Telangana
2004 establishments in Andhra Pradesh
Educational institutions established in 2004